The Bolivia women's national volleyball team represents Bolivia in international women's volleyball competitions and friendly matches.

It finished 6th at the 2005 Women's South American Volleyball Championship.

References

External links
Bolivia Volleyball Federation

National women's volleyball teams
Volleyball
Volleyball in Bolivia
Women's sport in Bolivia